Folker is a German music magazine. It deals with folk, traditional and world music. The magazine is published bimonthly by the Christian-Ludwig-Verlag in Moers since 1998. Publisher is Mike Kamp. Its editor in chief is Michael Kleff and the final editing is led by Stefan Backes.

References

External links 
 Official Website

1998 establishments in Germany
Bi-monthly magazines published in Germany
Folk music magazines
German folk music
German-language magazines
Music magazines published in Germany
Magazines established in 1998
World music